Devil Fish is a maze arcade game released by Taiwanese company Artic Electronics in 1982. It was not ported to any home systems.

Gameplay
The player uses a four-position joystick to maneuver a dog through a maze and avoid several wandering squid. The maze is filled with gates of varying sizes that slow the player's movement while passing through them. The player must pick up fish as they appear, then press a button to drop them and lure the squid toward the gates. Tunnels allow the player to move from the left side to the right and vice versa; some tunnels are permanently open, while others have barriers that periodically open and close.

When a squid eats a fish, it increases in size. If a squid comes to a gate that is too small for it to fit through, it becomes stuck for a short time, during which the player can destroy it by running into it. Doing so causes a small cabin to appear near the center of the maze. The player must then touch this cabin, causing it to disappear and revealing a portion of a picture in the large center square. Once the entire picture is revealed, the player moves on to the next level. One life is lost if the dog touches a squid not caught in a gate.

References

External links

1982 video games
Arcade video games
Arcade-only video games
Fictional squid
Maze games
Video games about dogs
Video games developed in Taiwan